Louise Adélaïde Desnos, also known as Louise Desnos (25 August 1807 – 9 September 1878), was a French portrait and history painter.

Gallery

Works

References

External links 
Louise Adélaïde Desnos in the BnF database

French women painters
French portrait painters
French history painters
1807 births
1878 deaths
19th-century French women artists
Painters from Paris